In computing, Stalin (STAtic Language ImplementatioN) is a programming language, an aggressive optimizing batch whole-program Scheme compiler written by Jeffrey Mark Siskind. It uses advanced data flow analysis and type inference and a variety of other optimization methods to produce code. Stalin is intended for production use in generating an optimized executable.

The compiler runs slowly, with little or no support for debugging or other niceties. Full R4RS Scheme is supported, with a few minor and rarely encountered omissions. Interfacing to external C libraries is straightforward. The compiler does lifetime analysis and hence does not generate as much garbage as might be expected, but global reclamation of storage is done using the Boehm garbage collector.

The name is a joke: "Stalin brutally optimizes."

Stalin is free and open-source software, licensed under a GNU General Public License (GPL), and is available online.

See also
 Chicken (Scheme implementation)
 Gambit (Scheme implementation)

External links

A Google Code project - includes a Windows version and a GUI
Research Statement by Siskind (compares Stalin with other Scheme compilers, and states that "STALIN often generates code that outperforms handwritten C and Fortran code.")
Flow-Directed Lightweight Closure Conversion by Siskind (presents a lightweight closure-conversion method that is driven by the results of whole-program interprocedural flow, reachability, points-to, and escape analyses, used in the Stalin compiler)

Scheme (programming language) compilers
Scheme (programming language) implementations
Free compilers and interpreters